was a town located in Izumi District, Kagoshima Prefecture, Japan.

As of 2003, the town had an estimated population of 4,913 and a density of 160.56 persons per km². The total area was 30.60 km².

On March 13, 2006, Noda, along with the town of Takaono (also from Izumi District), was merged into the expanded city of Izumi and no longer exists as an independent municipality.

External links
 Official website of Izumi  (some content in English)

Dissolved municipalities of Kagoshima Prefecture